Kevin Kennon (born  in Palos Verdes, California) is an American architect. Kennon is the Director of the Institute for Architecture and Urban Studies and is a founding principal of United Architects, a finalist in the prestigious 2002 World Trade Center Design Competition organized by the Lower Manhattan Development Corporation.

Biography 
Kennon is the son of Paul A. Kennon, an architect who served as dean of the School of Architecture at Rice University. Kennon graduated from Amherst College with a bachelor's degree in literature and pursued architecture studies in The Institute for Architecture and Urban Studies in 1978. In 1988, he joined Kohn Pedersen Fox (KPF) in New York and became a partner in 1996. Kennon left KPF in 2002 and established his office in New York City, and has served as director of The Institute for Architecture and Urban Studies since 2001.

In 2002 he founded Kevin Kennon Architects, an architecture and design firm based in New York City.

As a founding principal of United Architects, Kevin Kennon was a finalist in the prestigious 2002 World Trade Center Design Competition organized by the Lower Manhattan Development Corporation. His work has been exhibited widely and is in the Permanent Collection of the Museum of Modern Art. He has received major design awards ranging from the American Institute of Architects, the Architectural League Young Architects Award, and the Progressive Architecture Award. His monograph, “Architecture Tailored” DD Publication #16, was published in 2006. He has taught at Yale University, Princeton University, the Cooper Union, and Columbia University and has lectured at Princeton, Yale, Rice, University of Houston, Amherst College, and the Architectural League of New York.

Kevin Kennon is the Executive Director of the Paul Kennon Memorial Symposium at Rice University, Houston, and Executive Director of the Institute for Architecture and Urban Studies. The Institute is a not-for-profit educational organization that provides an introduction to the culture of architecture. He was also a founder and Chairman of the Beaux-Arts Ball for the Architectural League from 1989-91.

Notable projects 

 100 William Street
 American Express Building, 157 Hudson Street New York 
 Bloomingdale's Chestnut Hill
 Bloomingdale's Costa Mesa
 Bloomingdale's Fashion Island Newport
 Bloomingdale's Glendale
 Bloomingdale's Miami
 Bloomingdale's Orlando
 Bloomingdale's Palo Alto
 Bloomingdale's San Francisco at Westfield San Francisco Centre
 Bloomingdale's Santa Monica at Santa Monica Place
 Columbus Indiana Learning Center (Kohn Pedersen Fox, Kevin Kennon Design Principal)
 Glendale Galleria
 Incubator Arts Project
 Lehman Brothers Headquarters (Kohn Pedersen Fox, Kevin Kennon Design Principal)
 Macy's Herald Square
 Pier 17
 Rodin Gallery
 Samsung Headquarters (Kohn Pedersen Fox, Kevin Kennon Design Principal)
 Sanya Resort
 Sotheby’s Headquarters (Kohn Pedersen Fox, Kevin Kennon Design Principal)
 Tian Fang Tower, Tianjin, China
 World Trade Center Competition
 World Trade Center Site Viewing Platform

Competitions 
 World Trade Center Competition, 2003 – ‘‘Finalist’’
 Robbins School Elementary School Competition, 2005 – ‘‘Finalist’’
 City Lights Competition NYC, 2005 – ‘‘Finalist’’
 The Martin Luther King Jr. Memorial Competition, 2000 – ‘‘2nd Place’’
 The Film House, The Architect’s Dream House Competition, 1995 – ‘‘1st Place’’
 The Foundations House, The Architect’s Dream House Competition, 1995 – ‘‘2nd Place’’

Exhibitions 
 ‘‘‘‘‘WTC/UA entry’’’’’, MoMA Permanent Collection
 ‘‘‘‘‘UA Exhibition’’’’’, Grimaldi Forum, Monaco, 2006
 ‘‘‘‘‘Tall Buildings’’’’’ Museum of Modern Art, New York, 2004
 ‘‘‘‘‘Beyond the Box’’’’’ The Municipal Society of New York, 1995
 ‘‘‘‘‘Architects Dream’’’’’ Center for Contemporary Architecture, Cincinnati, OH, 1995
 ‘‘‘‘‘On Hold’’’’’ Young Architects Annual Competition Exhibition, Architectural League of New York, 1992
 ‘‘‘‘‘New Schools for New York’’’’’ Architectural League of New York, 1992
 ‘‘‘‘‘Vacant Lots’’’’’ Architectural League of New York, 1990

Awards 
,
 ICSC Best of the Best VIVA Award – Bloomingdale's Santa Monica, 2013
 ICSC US Design Development Award – Bloomingdale's Santa Monica, 2012
 ICSC International Design & Development Award, 2008
 New York Chapter AIA Project Design Honor Award – The Incubator, 2006
 Robbins School Elementary Competition Finalist, 2005
 NYC City Lights Competition Finalist, 2005
 MoMA Permanent Collection – WTC/UA entry, 2003
 New York City Chapter AIA Design Award – The Rodin Museum, 2001
 New York City Chapter AIA Project Design Award – The Columbus Indiana Learning Center, 2001
 Jersey City Good Neighbor Award – Harborside Plaza Building 4A, 2001
 Construction News Award – 745 Seventh Avenue, 2001
 I.D. Magazine Award, Best of Category – Rodin Museum, 2000
 Saflex Safe and Sound Award – Rodin Museum, 1999
 New York State AIA Design Award – Rodin Museum, 1999
 American Architecture Award – Rodin Museum, 1999
 New York Chapter AIA Project Design Award – Rodin Museum, 1998
 New York State AIA Award – Bloomingdale’s Aventura, 1998
 Progressive Architecture Award – Rodin Museum, 1997
 New York City Chapter AIA Project Design Honor Award – The Film House, 1996
 New York City Chapter AIA Project Design Award – The Foundations House, 1996
 The Architect's Dream House Competition 1st Place – The Film House, 1995
 Young Architects Award from the Architectural League of New York, 1993

References 

Kennon, Kevin. ‘‘Architecture Tailored’’. Seoul, DAMDI, 2006.
Kennon, Kevin. ‘‘The Rodin Museum, Seoul’’. New York, Princeton Architectural Press, 2001.
http://moma.org/collection/browse_results.php?criteria=O%3AAD%3AE%3A27435&page_number=1&template_id=6&sort_order=1

External links 

 
 Kevin Kennon Architects profile on Archiplanet
 Bloomingdales in Orlando designed by Kevin Kennon Architects
 NY Times article of Sketchpad
 100 Williams Street
 NY Times slideshow if 100 Williams Street
 Ground Zero Viewing Platform
 Video Interview with Kennon
 157 Hudson St
 Infosys Software Development Research Campus
 Taifeng Tower
 Architectural Record Article of Columbus Indiana Learning Center
 United Architects

1958 births
Living people
American architects
Princeton University alumni
Amherst College alumni
Columbia University faculty
Yale University faculty
Cooper Union faculty
People from Palos Verdes, California